Tinaroo is a rural locality in the Tablelands Region, Queensland, Australia. The town of Tinaroo Falls is on the eastern edge of the locality beside Lake Tinaroo.

Geography
Tinaroo is located on the shore of Lake Tinaroo, a man-made reservoir.

Despite the town's name, the waterfall of the same name is not in either the town or the locality but it is very close by in the neighbouring locality of Lake Tinaroo, which includes the Tinaroo Dam, the lake it impounds and the shoreline around the lake.

History 
The town and locality take their name from Tinaroo Creek, which is believed to derive from tin hurroo, a shout used by tin miners.

See also
 Lake Tinaroo

References

External links
 
 Town map of Tinaroo Falls, 1978

Towns in Queensland
Populated places in Far North Queensland
Tablelands Region
Localities in Queensland